The 1847 Rye by-election was held on 23 December 1847 at the town hall, Rye. It was called after the death of the incumbent Herbert Barrett Curteis (Whig).  His son Herbert Mascall Curteis,  also a Whig, was elected unopposed.

References 

By-elections to the Parliament of the United Kingdom in Sussex constituencies
Rye, East Sussex
Unopposed by-elections to the Parliament of the United Kingdom in English constituencies
December 1847 events
1847 elections in the United Kingdom
1847 in England
19th century in Sussex